The 2010–11 Scottish Youth Cup is the 28th season of Scotland's annual competition run by Scottish Football Association. The holders Celtic defeated Rangers 2–0 in last season's final.

Calendar

Format
First Round - 40 teams are divided geographically. 19 teams go into the Central Group, 10 into the North Group and 11 into the South Group. In this groups teams are played respectively only 3, 2 and 3 matches, while rest of teams go straight into the Second Round as byes.
Second Round - 8 winners of the First Round join 24 teams, who did not play in the previous round.
Third Round - 16 winners of the Second Round join 16 seeded teams, who started at this stage.
Fourth Round - 16 winners of the Third Round.
Quarter-finals - 8 winners of the Fourth Round.
Semi-finals - 4 winners of the Quarter-finals.
Final - 2 winners of the Semi-finals.

Fixtures & Results

First round
The First round draw was conducted on 1 September 2010.

Central Group
Alloa Athletic, Arbroath, Civil Service Strollers, Clyde, Dumbarton, Edinburgh, Greenock Morton, Montrose, Motherwell, Partick Thistle, Raith Rovers, Spartans, Stirling Albion receive byes into the Second Round.

Source: http://news.bbc.co.uk/sport2/hi/football/scot_cups/default.stm

North Group
Cove Rangers, Deveronvale, Elgin City, Fraserburgh, Inverness Caledonian Thistle, Peterhead receive byes into the Second Round.

Source: http://news.bbc.co.uk/sport2/hi/football/scot_cups/default.stm

South Group
Ayr United, Coldstream, Gala Fairydean, Newton Stewart, St Cuthbert Wanderers receive byes into the Second Round.

Source: http://news.bbc.co.uk/sport2/hi/football/scot_cups/default.stm

Second round
The Second round draw was conducted on 15 September 2010.

Central Group
Source: http://news.bbc.co.uk/sport2/hi/football/scot_cups/default.stm

North Group
Source: http://news.bbc.co.uk/sport2/hi/football/scot_cups/default.stm

South Group
Source: http://news.bbc.co.uk/sport2/hi/football/scot_cups/default.stm

Third round
The Third round draw was conducted on 21 October 2010.

Source: http://news.bbc.co.uk/sport2/hi/football/scot_cups/default.stm

Fourth round
The Fourth round draw was conducted on 12 November 2010.

Source: http://news.bbc.co.uk/sport2/hi/football/scot_cups/default.stm

Quarter-finals
The Quarter-finals draw was conducted on 27 January 2011.

Source: http://news.bbc.co.uk/sport2/hi/football/scot_cups/default.stm

Semi-finals
The Semi-finals draw was conducted after Quarter-finals matches.

Final

External links
 Official site

References

5
Scottish Youth Cup seasons